Kshitiz may refer to

Kshitiz Educational Foundation in Nepal 
Kshitiz, a national inter-college festival in India, see Rajkiya Engineering College, Ambedkar Nagar
Kshitiz Sharma (born 1990), Indian cricketer